Franz Firbas (born 4 June 1902 in Prague; died 19 February 1964 in Göttingen) was a German botanist who taught at the University of Göttingen. From 1952 to 1964, he was director of their Systematisch-Geobotanisches Institut.  Former students include Otto Ludwig Lange, Gerhard Lang, and Heinz Ellenberg.

Education
Firbas studied at the German branch of Charles University (German Charles-Ferdinand University) under Prof. K. Rudolph. He was an assistant professor for a short time, before leaving to go to Germany.

References

20th-century German botanists
Academic staff of the University of Göttingen
Charles University alumni
Academic staff of Charles University
1902 births
1964 deaths
Czechoslovak emigrants to Germany